Treitschke (ennobled: von Treitschke) is a German surname, most famously borne by a family from Saxony. It may refer to:

 Curt Erwin Franz Gustav Treitschkede: (1872–1946), military officer and cartographer
 Eduard Heinrich von Treitschkede: (1796–1867), military officer
 Georg Carl Treitschkede: (1783–1855), jurist and author
 Georg Friedrich Treitschke (1776–1842), artist and scientist
 Heinrich Gotthard von Treitschke (1834–1896), German historian and nationalist
 Heinrich Leo von Treitschkede: (1840–1927), military officer

German-language surnames
Saxon nobility

de:Treitschke